, commonly translated as "comma", is a comma-like swirl symbol used in Japanese  (roughly equivalent to a heraldic badge or charge in European heraldry).

The  appears in many designs with various uses. The simplest, most common patterns of the device contain from one to four , and are reminiscent of similar designs that have been found in wide distribution around the world.

Etymology
The character 巴 (Chinese pronunciation bā) has several meanings, ranging from a Sichuan toponym  to a crust formed by dryness, parts of the body such as hands or cheeks, and, as a verb, bearing the sense of  "to hope", "expect" or "be anxious over". The Chinese character used to depict, according to Bernhard Karlgren's interpretation of the small seal script graph, a python.  The Japanese word itself may be of Mongolic origin, since it bears comparison with Middle Mongol  "twisted horse headdress", from the verb  (plait, twist), and Ordos Mongolian t'omok ('a little bag hung on a horse's head'). In this latter connection Tang ceramic figures of horses show small sacks tethered to the lower neck, perhaps to stop the horse from throwing its head back.

Roy Andrew Miller describes it as "a small hollow sack or bulb of sewn leather with leather tie straps, sometimes embossed with a comma like decorative device of continental origin". It was worn on the left elbow or wrist of an archer either to prevent chafing from the bowstring (: 弦) twanging back to position on the release of an arrow, or to strike fear into the enemy from the sharp sound caused by the bowstring hitting the wrist guard. The 'tomo picture' can therefore be interpreted either as a visual pun on the tomo represented, or, otherwise, as taking its name from that object. Several such examples are conserved in Nara at the Shōsōin. 

An alternative interpretation takes it to be a stylized magatama.

Theories of its origin
The origin of the  design is uncertain. A pattern resembling the two-comma  has been found in ancient cultures on all inhabited continents. A stylized design on a Yangshao bowl dates back to 2,000 BCE. The motif of  two encircling dolphins biting each other's tails has been found on Cretan ceramics dating from the Minoan period (1700-1400 BCE), and the two fish biting each other in circular fashion recurs in both Chinese and Central Mexican ware. In China, the double comma form came to be assimilated to the Yin-Yang philosophy of opposing male/female principles, formalized in the  design of the late Song Dynasty period. This in turn recurs in the seventh century in Unified Silla (now Korea), where it was known as taegeuk. and replicated in the Japanese  and  patterns, the former in association with divinatory rites, the latter frequently linked to temple drums with apotropaic functions.

Tomoe emblem history in Japan

As a leather wrist protector  appear to have been employed at least as early as the Kofun period, where they are frequently attested on haniwa terracotta figurines depicting archers,  and may even have had, aside from their military function, a ritual or fetish value, perhaps related to their phallic shape.

The tomoe emblem established itself as a common emblem during the Fujiwara ascendency of the late Heian period, around the 10th-11th centuries, and proliferated through to Kamakura times. It is thought that a resemblance between the tomoe and the Emperor Ōjin found in the Nihongi may also account for its rising popularity among samurai, since  Ōjin was apotheosized as a god in Hachiman shrines.

Usage in Ryukyu

Fragmentary sources suggest that the First Shō dynasty, who founded the Ryukyu Kingdom, used the symbol if not as their family crest. American historian George H. Kerr claims that King Shō Toku adopted the mitsudomoe as the crest of the royal house after his successful invasion of Kikai Island in 1465. The Second Shō dynasty, who ruled the Ryukyu Kingdom from 1470 to 1879, adopted the mitsudomoe as its family crest. Since it was the royal family crest, its usage was once severely restricted. Okinawans who visited Japan shortly after the kingdom's annexation in 1879 were surprised that mitsudomoe banners were flown everywhere. During the American military occupation of Okinawa Prefecture, the United States Civil Administration of the Ryukyu Islands (USCAR) made a failed attempt to recreate a Ryukyuan national flag with a mitsudomoe, only to find that Okinawans were apathetic towards, or did not recognize, the former royal family's symbol. Today the symbol is still regarded as a symbol for Ryukyu and, to a lesser extent, Okinawa.

Symbolism and uses
The  is closely associated with Shinto shrines, in particular those dedicated to Hachiman, the god of war and archery. Hachiman in Shinto cosmology and ritual, as for example at  Hakozaki Shrine, is repeatedly connected  with the number three. In Shintoist thinking, this number is taken to represent the three aspects of the four mitama or 'souls' (the other, the  being considered far rarer).

It is also commonly displayed on banners and lanterns used in festivals and rituals related to  Amaterasu-ōmikami, who in the Kojiki  confronts her brother Susanoo when he usurps her terrain on earth by dressing as an archer, adorned with magatama beads and 'an awesome high arm-guard'.

A third element of its symbolic panorama concerns water, an association engendered by its swirling pattern. For this reason, it is said to be located on roofs and gables as a charm against fire.

Among aristocrats, the Saionji family used it as its family emblem. The Koyasan Shingon sect of Buddhism uses the mitsudomoe as a visual representation of the cycle of life.

Tomoe also is a personal name, dating at least back to Tomoe Gozen (巴御前), a famous female warrior celebrated in The Tale of the Heike account of the Genpei War. In Kyoto's Jidai Matsuri festival, she appears in the Heian period section of the procession in samurai costume, and parades as a symbol of feminine gallantry.

The mitsudomoe is also the symbol of the Electro element in the game Genshin Impact, due to the fact that the element's associated domain, Inazuma, is based on ancient or medieval Japan.

The tomoe has also been adopted as a corporate logo in Japan.

The mitsudomoe is also the logo of the OBS Studio application since it released in 2012.

Similar designs
The two-fold  is almost identical in its design elements to the Chinese symbol known as a taijitu, while the three-fold  is very similar to the Korean tricolored taegeuk. Also note that the negative space in between the swirls of a fourfold  forms a swastika-like shape, which is fairly prominent in many Indian religions such as Hinduism and Jainism and Buddhism. A similar design can also be found in the some forms of the Celtic spiral triskele as well as with the Basque lauburu and the Sicilian Trinacria.

Gallery

See also
 Gankyil, a symbol in Tibetan and East Asian Buddhism composed of three swirling and interconnected blades
 Gogok, a comma-shaped jewel found in the Korean Peninsula
 Lauburu, the Basque cross
 Mon (emblem)

Notes

Explanatory footnotes

Citations

Sources

External links

Japan Emblem Library - tomoe design patterns 
JAANUS/ tomoemon

Visual motifs
Japanese heraldry